WellChild is a charity that provides care for seriously ill children and young people in the United Kingdom, founded in 1977. The charity introduced and funds WellChild Nurses, who provide care and support to children and young people needing long-term or complex care, helping children to leave hospital and be cared for at home.

The charity also operates Helping Hands, a home improvement scheme which, with the support of volunteer teams from local companies and organisations, provides home and garden improvement projects aiming to make homes more suitable for their needs. The group also invests money in children's health research and projects, hosts online and face-to-face groups for families, campaigns on behalf of ill children and support professionals, and supports families who have children with the rare genetic condition Wolfram syndrome.

History 
The charity was founded in 1977 with the name "Kidney", to fund research into kidney disease. It was set up by an individual whose friend's daughter died of kidney disease.

"Kidney" later changed its name to "Children Nationwide Medical Research Foundation", and developed into supporting more areas of paediatric research. The charity was eventually renamed "WellChild" in 2003.

In 2003 WellChild began to offer more support to sick and seriously ill children, including children's nurses and the Helping Hands projects. WellChild presently works with the children and the families of children with a variety of long-term and complex health conditions.

COVID-19

During the 2020 Coronavirus outbreak, the charity launched a direct response service to help source and deliver Personal Protective Equipment (PPE) for families caring for seriously ill children at home. The service also provided advice on how to access food and medicine deliveries.

Patron and ambassadors
WellChild's patron is Prince Harry, who takes an active interest in the charity's work and has met with many of the children and young people, nurses, researchers and volunteers who have been involved with the charity. It is one of the four charities which Harry and his wife chose to ask people to donate to instead of sending gifts for their newborn baby in 2019.

Celebrity ambassadors for the charity include:
 Duncan Bannatyne OBE
 Mark Foster
 Karren Brady CBE
 Alexandra Burke
 Gaby Roslin
 Emily Maitlis
 Ed Chamberlin
 Oliver Phelps
 Ian Waite
 Chris Hollins
 Scouting for Girls
 Janet Ellis
 Sam Nixon and Mark Rhodes
 Laura Hamilton
 Lauren Drummond
 Gillian McKeith
 Sarah Barrand
 Samantha Quek
 Diversity (dance troupe)

WellChild Awards 
WellChild Awards is an annual event that takes place in London, with celebrities and ambassadors hosting the event and presenting awards to the winners. Prince Harry attends this event and meets the award winners. In 2015 the television programme Good Morning Britain had their own category in the awards called "Good Morning Britain's Young Hero Award 2015", which they opened to the public for nominations.

References

External links

Children's charities based in the United Kingdom
Health in Gloucestershire
Organisations based in Cheltenham
Health charities in the United Kingdom
1977 establishments in the United Kingdom